Eduard L. Stiefel (21 April 1909 – 25 November 1978) was a Swiss mathematician. Together with Cornelius Lanczos and Magnus Hestenes, he invented the conjugate gradient method, and gave what is now understood to be a partial construction of the Stiefel–Whitney classes of a real vector bundle, thus co-founding the study of characteristic classes.

Biography
Stiefel entered the Swiss Federal Institute of Technology (ETH Zurich) in 1928. He received his Ph.D. in 1935 under Heinz Hopf; his dissertation was titled "Richtungsfelder und Fernparallelismus in n-dimensionalen Mannigfaltigkeiten". Stiefel completed his habilitation in 1942. Besides his academic pursuits, Stiefel was also active as a military officer, rising to the rank of colonel in the Swiss army during World War II.

Stiefel achieved his full professorship at ETH Zurich in 1943, founding the Institute for Applied Mathematics five years later. The objective of the new institute was to design and construct an electronic computer (the Elektronische Rechenmaschine der ETH, or ERMETH). He spent a year in the United States commencing in August, 1951. During this time, he met Magnus Hestenes and many other scientists at the National Bureau of Standards and these professional associations served him well during the remainder of his career at Zurich.

Known for
 Stiefel manifold
 Stiefel–Whitney class

References
 
 How Professor Eduard Stiefel Got to NBS-INA-UCLA in August 1951 John Todd's lecture (2002) about his association with Eduard Stiefel.
 
 Numerical Analysis in Zurich – 50 Years Ago by Martin H. Gutknecht of ETH Zurich.
 "Direction fields and teleparallelism in n-dimensional manifolds," translation of thesis by D. H. Delphenich

1909 births
1978 deaths
20th-century Swiss mathematicians
Academic staff of ETH Zurich